Songtao Miao Autonomous County is an autonomous county in the northeast of Guizhou province, China, bordering Chongqing to the north and Hunan province to the east. It is under the administration of the prefecture-level city of Tongren.

Administrative divisions

Towns (13): Liaogao | Pandan | Panxin | Dapingchang | Pujiao | Zhaiying | Mengqi | Wuluo | Ganlong | Changxingbao | Yajia | Daxing | Niulang

Townships (15): Jiujang | Shichang | Zhengda | Changping | Taipingying | Pingtou | Dalu | Miao'ai | Lengshuiqi | Danliang | Waqi | Yong'an | Mushu | Huangban | Shabahe

Climate

References

External links
Official website of Songtao County government

 
County-level divisions of Guizhou
Miao autonomous counties